Choline chloride is an organic compound with the formula . It is a quaternary ammonium salt, consisting of choline cations and chloride anions. It is bifunctional compound, meaning, it contains both quaternary ammonium functional group and a hydroxyl functional group. The cation of this salt, choline, occurs in nature in living beings. Choline chloride is a white, water-soluble salt used mainly in animal feed.

Synthesis
In the laboratory, choline can be prepared by methylation of dimethylethanolamine with methyl chloride.

Choline chloride is mass-produced with world production estimated at 160 000 tons in 1999. Industrially, it is produced by the reaction of ethylene oxide, hydrogen chloride, and trimethylamine, or from the pre-formed salt:

Choline chloride can also be made by treating trimethylamine with 2-chloroethanol.

Applications
It is an important additive in feed especially for chickens where it accelerates growth. It forms a deep eutectic solvent with urea, ethylene glycol, glycerol, and many other compounds. 

It is also used as a clay control additive in fluids used for hydraulic fracturing.

Related salts
Other commercial choline salts are choline hydroxide and choline bitartrate. In foodstuffs, the compound is often present as phosphatidylcholine.

References

Quaternary ammonium compounds
Primary alcohols